Elephants Back is a 9,585-foot-elevation (2,922 meter) mountain summit located in Alpine County, California, United States.

Description
This landmark of Hope Valley is set in the Mokelumne Wilderness of the Sierra Nevada mountain range. Elephants Back is a lava dome which was created in association with the now-inactive volcanic vent that is Round Top. Precipitation runoff from the peak's east slope drains to the West Fork Carson River via Red Lake Creek, whereas the west slope drains to Caples Lake via Woods Creek. The Pacific Crest Trail traverses the eastern and northern slopes of this peak, providing an approach from California State Route 88.

History

During his second exploratory expedition, John C. Frémont camped at the base of Elephants Back's north ridge on February 9, 1844. At this spot, the party burned two trees to protect themselves from icy winds of a fierce winter storm. Frémont and Kit Carson made the first known ascent of Elephants Back three days earlier, on February 6, 1844, and were able to see the Sacramento Valley from the summit.

The United States Geological Survey surveyed this area in 1889 and labelled this geographic feature on their 1893 Markleeville quadrangle map. This landform is so named because of its resemblance to the animal. This landform's toponym has been officially adopted by the U.S. Board on Geographic Names. It has also been called "Elephant Mountain", "Elephant's Back", and "The Elephant."

Climate
According to the Köppen climate classification system, Elephants Back is located in an alpine climate zone. Most weather fronts originate in the Pacific Ocean and travel east toward the Sierra Nevada mountains. As fronts approach, they are forced upward by the peaks (orographic lift), causing them to drop their moisture in the form of rain or snowfall onto the range.

Gallery

See also
 
 Stevens Peak
 Red Lake Peak

References

External links
 Weather forecast: Elephants Back

North American 2000 m summits
Mountains of Northern California
Mountains of the Sierra Nevada (United States)
Mountains of Alpine County, California
Humboldt–Toiyabe National Forest
Eldorado National Forest
Lava domes